List of Adelaide parks and gardens refers to parks and gardens within the metropolitan area in South Australia known as Adelaide.

Northern Adelaide
The South Australian government region known as Northern Adelaide and which occupies the northern end of the Adelaide metropolitan area consists of the following local government areas: the City of Playford, the City of Salisbury, the City of Tea Tree Gully and the east half of the City of Port Adelaide Enfield.

Playford
 Dauntsey Reserve BMX Skate - Woodford Road, Elizabeth
 Fremont Park - Yorktown Road, Elizabeth
 Kalara Reserve - Bulkington Road, Davoren Park
 Ramsay Park - Womma Road, Edinburgh North
 Smithfield Civic Park - Anderson Walk, Smithfield
 Stebonheath Park - Davoren Road, Andrews Farm
 Womma Park - Womma Road, Edinburgh North

Port Adelaide Enfield (part)
 Jack Watkins Reserve - Churchill Road, Kilburn
 L.J. Lewis Garden Reserve - Grand Junction Road, Northfield
 Harry Wierda Reserve formerly Regent Gardens Reserve - Sir Ross Smith Boulevard, Oakden
 Stockade Botanical Park - Hoods Road, Northfield

Salisbury
 Baltimore Reserve - Meredith Street, Parafield Gardens
 Bolivar Road Reserve Dog Park - Bolivar Road, Bolivar
 Carisbrooke Reserve - Main North Road, Salisbury Park
 Dry Creek Linear Park - Walkleys Road, Walkley Heights
 Golding Oval Park Dog Park - Redhill Road, Para Vista
 Happy Home Reserve - Watloo Corner Road, Salisbury North
 Harry Bowey Reserve - Riverside Drive, Salisbury Park
 Jenkins Reserve - Fendon Road, Salisbury Park
 Kentish Green - Barina Avenue, Para Vista
 Linbolm Park - McCarthy Court, Pooraka
 Pitman Pioneer Park - Commercial Road, Salisbury
 Pooraka Triangle Park - South Terrace, Pooraka
 Salisbury North Sports - Bagsters Road, Salisbury North
The Paddocks - Bridge Road, Para Hills West
 Thomas Turner Reserve - Nelson Road, Valley View

Tea Tree Gully
 Civic Park - North East Road, Modbury
 Goldenfields Reserve, The Golden Way, Golden Grove
 Bicentennial Drive Pet Park - Bicentennial Drive, Golden Grove
 Jubilee Reserve - Jubilee Way, Wynn Vale
 Modbury Sports Reserve - Ashley Avenue, Ridgehaven

Western Adelaide
The South Australian government region known as Western Adelaide and which occupies the area in the Adelaide metropolitan area located to the north-west of the Adelaide city centre consists of the following local government areas: the City of Charles Sturt, the City of West Torrens and the western half of the City of Port Adelaide Enfield.

Charles Sturt
 Collins Reserve - Valetta Road, Kidman Park
Henley Square - Seaview Road, Henley Beach 
 Point Malcolm Reserve - Military Road, Semaphore Park
 St. Clair Reserve - Woodville Road, Woodville 
 West Lakes Aquatic Reserve - Hero Way, West Lakes

Port Adelaide Enfield (part)
Alan Iverson Reserve, Langham Place, Port Adelaide	
Almond Tree Flat Reserve, Centre Street, Largs Bay
Birkenhead Naval Reserve, Heath Street, Birkenhead
Catherine Hutton Reserve, Lady Gowrie Drive, North Haven
Company Square Reserve, Todd Street, Alberton
Duffield Reserve, Russell Street, Rosewater
E P Nazer Reserve, Swan Terrace, Semaphore South
E S P Rogers Reserve, Ellaway Avenue, North Haven
Eastern Parade Reserve, Eastern Parade, Ottoway
Emerald Park Reserve, Rosewater Terrace, Ottoway
Eric Sutton Reserve, Chad Street, Rosewater
G E Hunter Reserve, Fraser Drive, North Haven
Goldingham Reserve, Paringa Street, Taperoo
I W Fotheringham Memorial Reserve, Lady Gowrie Drive, North Haven
J B Dearing Reserve, Chusan Court, North Haven
J S Morton Reserve, Fotheringham Road, North Haven
James Bailey Reserve, Portland Road, Queenstown
John Hart Reserve, Swan Terrace, Ethelton
Joyce Snadden Reserve, Minories, Port Adelaide
Kenmare Street Reserve, Kenmare Street, Taperoo
Koombana Reserve, Koombana Terrace, Osborne
Largs North Reserve, Victoria Road, Largs North
Largs Reserve, Woolnough Road, Largs Bay
Le Fevre Recreation Reserve Victoria Road, North Haven
McNicol Reserve, McNicol Terrace, Rosewater
Montpelier Square Reserve, Montpelier Square, Port Adelaide
New Haven Reserve, The Walkway, North Haven
Old Port Canal Gardens, Church Street, Port Adelaide
One And All Drive Reserve, One And All Drive, North Haven
Peter Cousins Reserve, Victoria Road, Osborne
Peter Nicholls Reserve, Hargrave Street, Peterhead
Phillips Reserve, Swan Terrace, Semaphore South
Port Adelaide Reserve, Langham Place, Port Adelaide
Portside Christian Reserve, Bower Road, New Port
Promenade Newport Reserve, River Frontage, New Port
R B Connolly Reserve, Grose Crescent, North Haven
Robin Road Reserve, Robin Road, Semaphore
Roy Marten Park, Military Road, Taperoo
Second Street Reserve, Second Street, Wingfield
St Patricks Square Reserve Melbourne Place, Alberton
TC Diver Derrick Memorial Reserve, Carlise Street, Glanville
Timeball Tower Reserve, Esplanade, Semaphore
Wal Kilpatrick Reserve, Brunswick Avenue, North Haven
Western Region Reserve, Old Port Road, Port Adelaide
White Hollow Reserve, Lady Gowrie Drive, Taperoo
Yandra Street Reserve, Yandra Street, Taperoo
Yongala Reserve, Yongala Street, Taperoo

West Torrens
 Anderson Reserve - Anderson Avenue, West Beach
 Cowandilla Reserve - Marion Road, Cowandilla
 Frank Norton Reserve - Torrens Street, Torrensville
 Jubilee Park - Wellington Street, Glandore
 Kings Reserve - Ashwin Parade, Torrensville
 Lockleys Oval - Rutland Avenue, Lockleys
 Mile End Common - Bagshaw Way, Mile End
 Rex Jones Reserve - Park Terrace, North Plympton
 Weigall Oval - Urrbrae Terrace, Plympton
 West Beach Apex Park - Burbridge Road, West Beach
 West Beach Skate Park - Africaine Road, West Beach

Eastern Adelaide
The South Australian government region known as Eastern Adelaide and which occupies the area to the immediate north, east and south of the Adelaide city centre consists of the following local government areas: the City of Adelaide, the City of Burnside, the City of Campbelltown, the City of Norwood Payneham & St Peters, the City of Prospect, the City of Unley and the Town of Walkerville.

Adelaide
 Adelaide Park Lands
{| class=wikitable
! ParkNumber !! Kaurnaname !! Englishname !!rowspan=11|  
! ParkNumber !! Kaurnaname !! Englishname !!rowspan=11|  
! ParkNumber !! Kaurnaname !! Englishname 
|-
| Park 1  || Pirltawardli     || Possum Park
| Park 11 || Tainmuntilla     || Mistletoe Park
| Park 21 || Walyu Yarta      || Veale Park
|-
| Park 2  || Pardipardinyilla || Denise Norton Park
| Park 12 || Karrawirra       || Red Gum Park
| Park 21W|| Mirnu Wirra      || Golden Wattle Park
|-
| Park 3  || Kantarilla       || Yam Daisy Park
| Park 13 || Kadlitpina       || Rundle Park
| Park 22 || Wikaparntu Wirra || Josie Agius Park
|-
| Park 4  || Kangatilla       || Reservoir Park
| Park 14 || Murlawirrapurka  || Rymill Park
| Park 23 || Wirrarninthi     || G S Kingston Park
|-
| Park 5  || Ngampa Yarta     || Bragg Park
| Park 15 || Ityamai-itpina   || King Rodney Park
| Park 24 || Tampawardli      || Ellis Park*
|-
| Park 6  || Nantu Wama       || Lefevre Park
| Park 16 || Pakapakanthi     || Victoria Park
| Park 25 || Narnungga        || Gladys Elphick Park
|-
| Park 7  || Kuntingga        ||rowspan=2| The Olive Groves
| Park 17 || Tuthangga        || Carriageway Park
| Park 26 || Tarntanya Wama   || Adelaide Oval*
|-
| Park 8  || Parngutilla 
| Park 18 || Wita Wirra       || Peppermint Park
| Park 27 || Tulya Wardli     || Bonython Park*
|-
| Park 9  || Tidlangga        || Bundey's Paddock
| Park 19 || Pityarilla       || Pelzer Park
| Park 28 || Pangki Pangki    || Palmer Gardens
|-
| Park 10 || Warnpangga       || Bullrush Park
| Park 20 || Kurangga         || Blue Gum Park
| Park 29 || Tandotittingga   || Brougham Gardens
|}
*These are also the names of smaller parts of the park land within which they are located.
{| class="wikitable sortable"
! Park/garden                 !! Parknumber   !! Locality
|-
| Adelaide Botanic Garden || Park 11      || North Terrace (east)
|-
| Adelaide Golf Links     ||  || War Memorial Drive (north)
|-
| Angas Gardens           || Park 12      || War Memorial Drive  & King William Road
|-
|   Barr Smith Walk           || Park 26 (SW) || River Torrens
|-
| Bonython Park           || Park 27 (NW) || Port Road (east)
|-
| Botanic Park || Park 11 || Hackney Road
|-
| Brougham Gardens        || Park 29      || Brougham Place
|-
|   Bush Magic Play Park      ||  || Fitzroy Terrace
|-
| City Sk8 Park*          || Park 27 (SE) || North Terrace (west)
|-
| Creswell Gardens        || Park 26      || War Memorial Drive & King William Road
|-
|   Cross of Sacrifice        || Park 12 (NW) || Sir Edwin Smith Avenue & King William Road
|-
| Dame Roma Mitchell Gardens || Park 27   || Within the walls of the Old Adelaide Gaol
|-
| Deceased Workers Memorial Forest || Park 27 || near Bonython Park
|-
|   Edwards Park              || Park 23 (SE) || West Terrace
|-
| Elder Park              || Park 26      || King William Road
|-
| Ellis Park || Park 24 || West Terrace
|-
|   Esther Lipman Gardens     || Park 12 (W) || King William Road & Victoria Drive
|-
|   Frome Park / Nellie Raminyemmerin Park || Park 11 (W) || Frome Road
|-
| Glover Playgrounds      ||  (W) || LeFevre Terrace opposite Tynte Street
|-
| Glover Playgrounds      || Park 15 (SW) || East Terrace & Wakefield Street
|-
| Glover Playgrounds      || Park 20      || South Terrace
|-
|   Grundy Gardens            || Park 12 (E)  || Frome Road & Victoria Drive 
|-
|   Helen Mayo Park           || Park 27 (SE) || Montefiore Road & River Torrens
|-
| Adelaide Himeji Garden          || Park 18      || South Terrace (east)
|-
|   John E Brown Park         || Park 27 (N)  || River Torrens
|-
|   Kate Cocks Park           || Park 27 (SW) || Port Road (east)
|-
|   Kingston Gardens          || Park 23 (NE) || West Terrace
|-
| Light's Vision          || Park 26 (NW) || Montefiore Hill
|-
|   Lundie Gardens            || Park 21W     || South Terrace (west)
|-
|   Mary Lee Park             || Park 27 (N)  || Park Terrace
|-
|   Nellie Raminyemmerin Park / Frome Park || Park 11 (W) || Frome Road
|-
|   Osmond Gardens            || Park 18      || South Terrace (east)
|-
|   Palmer Gardens            || Park 28      || Palmer Place, North Adelaide
|-
|   Peace Park                || Park 12 (NE) || Sir Edwin Smith Avenue 
|-
|   Pennington Gardens        || Park 26 (NE) || Pennington Terrace & King William Road
|-
| Pinky Flat              || Park 26      || War Memorial Drive
|-
| Pioneer Women's Memorial Gardens || Park 12 (W) || King William Road 
|-
|   Prince Henry Gardens      || Park 12 (S)  || North Terrace
|-
| Rundle Park             || Park 13      || East Terrace
|-
| Rymill Park             || Park 14      || East Terrace
|-
| Stella Bowen Park       || Park 26 (NW) || Pennington Terrace & Montefiore Road
|-
| University Oval || Park 12 || War Memorial Drive
|-
| Veale Gardens           || Park 21      || South Terrace
|-
| Victoria Park || Park 16 || East Terrace
|-
| Wirranendi              || Park 23 (NW) || Sir Donald Bradman Drive
|}
*City Sk8 Park has been replaced by the Biomedical Precinct
 Hindmarsh Square / Mukata
 Hurtle Square / Tangkaira
 Light Square / Wauwi
 Victoria Square / Tarntanyangga
 Whitmore Square / Iparrity
 Wellington Square / Kudnartu

Burnside
 Beaumont Common - The Common, Beaumont
 Bellyett Reserve - Cooper Angus Grove, Wattle Park
 Fergusson Square - Fergusson Square, Toorak Gardens
 Hazelwood Park - Greenhill Road, Hazelwood Park
 Kensington Park Reserve - The Parade, Kensington Park
 Langman Reserve, 
 Kensington Gardens (Reserve) - The Parade, Kensington Gardens
 Ray Cooper Gardens - Linden Avenue, Hazelwood Park
 Tusmore Park - Rivington Grove, Tusmore
 Warrego Reserve - Warrego Crescent, Linden Park
 Mariner Oval - Mariner Street, Linden Park
 Tregenza Oval - Booth Street, Linden Park
 Austral Park - Austral Avenue, Linden Park

Campbelltown
 Cambelltown Skate Park - Darley Road, Paradise
 Foxfield Oval Reserve - Maryvale Road, Athelstone
 The Gums Recreation Ground - Shakesphere Avenue, Tranmere
 Thorndon Park Reserve - Hamilton Terrace, Paradise

Norwood, Payneham and St Peters
 Drage Reserve - Riverside Drive, Felixstow
 Koster Park - Avonmore Avenue, Trinity Gardens
 Payneham Oval - John Street, Payneham
 Richards Park - Osmond Terrace, Maylands

Prospect
 Broadview Oval - Myponga Terrace, Broadview
 George Whittle Reserve - Churchhill Road, Prospect
 Memorial Gardens - Menzies Crescent, Prospect
 Peppermint Gum Reserve - Barker Road, Prospect
 Prospect Estate Reserve - Prospect Road, Prospect
 St Helens Park - Prospect Road, Prospect

Unley
 Forest Avenue Reserve - Forest Avenue, Black Forest
 Forrestville Reserve - Ethel Street, Forrestville
 Goodwood Oval - Curzon Avenue, Millswood
 Heywood Park - Addiscombe Place, Unley Park
 Ridge Park Reserve - Glen Osmond Road, Myrtle Bank
 Souter Park - Florence Street, Goodwood
 The Orphanage Reserve - Mitchell Street, Millswood
 Unley Park - Langham Terrace, Unley
 Wayville Reserve - Le Hunte Street, Wayville

Walkerville
 Howie Reserve - Victoria Terrace, Walkerville
 Levi Park - Vale Street, Vale Park
 Walkerville Recreation Garden - Smith Street, Walkerville
 Webster Reserve - Landsdowne Terrace, Vale Park
 Willow Bend Reserve - Part of the Torrens Linear Park, Vale Park

Southern Adelaide
The South Australian government region known as Southern Adelaide which occupies the southern end of the Adelaide metropolitan area consists of the following local government areas: the City of Holdfast Bay, the City of Marion, the City of Mitcham and the City of Onkaparinga.

Holdfast Bay
 Angus Neill Reserve - Esplanade, Seacliff
 Bindarra Reserve - Beach Road, Brighton
 Colley Reserve - Colley Terrace, Glenelg
 Moseley Square - Jetty Road, Glenelg
 Old Gum Tree Reserve - Cornish Street, Glenelg North
 Wigley Reserve - Adelphi Terrace, Glenelg

Marion
 Capella Drive Oval and Skate Park - Capella Drive, Hallett Cove
 Edwardstown Soldiers War Memorial Recreation Ground - East Terrace, South Plympton
 Glandore Oval - Naldera Street, Glandore
 Hazelmere Reserve - Oaklands Road, Glengowrie
 Marion Pool Park - Hendrie Street, Park Holme
 Oaklands Reserve - Bombay Street, Oaklands Park
 Serpentine Road Reserve - Serpentine Road, O'Halloran Hill
 Warriparinga - Sturt Road, Bedford Park

Mitcham
 Avenue Road Reserve - Avenue Road, Cumberland Park
 AA Bailey Reserve - Aldershot Street, Clarence Gardens
 CC Hood Park - Panorama Drive, Pasadena
 Clarendon Recreation Centre - Nicolle Road, Clarendon
 Happy Valley Sports Park - Taylors Road, Aberfoyle Park
 Hawthorndene Reserve - Watahuna Avenue, Hawthorndene
 Karinya Park - Shepherds Hill Road, Eden Hills
 McElligotts Quarry Reserve - Carrick Hill Drive, Springfield
 Mitcham Reserve - Norman Walk, Mitcham
 Mortlock Park - Sturt Avenue, Colonel Light Gardens
 Waite Arboretum - Fullarton Road, Urrbrae
 Wittunga Botanic Garden - Shepherds Hills Road, Blackwood

Onkaparinga
 Dressage Avenue Reserve - Dressage Avenue, Woodcroft
 Forsyth Reserve - Cottage Lane, Hackham
 John Bice Memorial Oval - Christie Avenue, Christies Beach
 Jubilee Park Adventure Playground - Saltfleet Street, Port Noarlunga South
 Markey Reserve - Patapinda Road, Old Noarlunga
 Moana Beach Recreation Reserve - Esplanade, Moana
 Silver Sands Beach - Esplanade, Aldinga Beach
 Symonds Reserve - Stewart Avenue, Aldinga Beach
 The Quarry Skate Park - Grand Boulevard, Seaford
 Wilfred Taylor Reserve - Wheatsheaf Road, Morphett Vale
 Wilunga Recreation Centre - Railway Terrace, Willunga

See also

List of protected areas in Adelaide
List of parks and gardens in rural South Australia

References

Parks in Adelaide
Parks
Adelaide
Adelaide
Gardens in South Australia
Lists of tourist attractions in South Australia
Adelaide